Sennivanam is a village in the Ariyalur taluk of Ariyalur district, Tamil Nadu, India.

Demographics 

 census, Sennivanam had a total population of 1680 with 790 males and 890 females. There is a Shiva temple in the southern side of this village.

References 

Villages in Ariyalur district